The Sun Odyssey 35 is a French sailboat that was designed by Marc Lombard and Eric Levet as a cruiser and first built in 2003.

The design was developed into the Sun Fast 35 cruiser-racer in 2004.

Production
The design was built by Jeanneau in France, starting in 2003, but it is now out of production.

Design
The Sun Odyssey 35 is a recreational keelboat, built predominantly of fiberglass. It has a fractional sloop rig, a raked stem, a walk-through reverse transom with a swimming platform, an internally mounted spade-type rudder controlled by a wheel and a retractable lifting keel. The version for the European market has twin rudders. It displaces  and carries  of ballast.

Operational history
A 2003 review in Sail magazine reported, "many boats with 'contemporary' styling, particularly those from Europe, tend to look amorphous, so it's refreshing to see a new design with truly clean and elegant lines. Jeanneau's latest addition to its long-lived Sun Odyssey line, drawn by Marc Lombard and Eric Levet, is just such a boat."

See also
List of sailing boat types

References

External links

Keelboats
2000s sailboat type designs
Sailing yachts
Sailboat type designs by Marc Lombard Design
Sailboat type designs by Eric Levet
Sailboat types built by Jeanneau